Steraspis squamosa  or the Middle Eastern jewel beetle is a beetle of the Buprestidae family.

Description
These beetles usually have a metallic green or bluish color with orange margin along the edges of the elytra and a rugose surface. They primarily feed on Tamarix, Rhus tripartita and Acacia. They lay the eggs on tree branches and the caterpillars drill hatching holes in the trunk. At the end of the process the insect bursts the bark and a new life cycle begin. The full life cycle last two years. Adult beetles are active in Spring.

Distribution
This species is present in the northern part of Africa, particularly from Red Sea, Sinai, Israel and Egypt to Syria, Mauritania, Algeria and Morocco.

Subspecies
 Steraspis squamosa kindermanni Marseul, 1865
 Steraspis squamosa squamosa (Klug, 1829)

Gallery

References
Biolib
Steraspis squamosa

External links
Nature of oz

Beetles of Asia
Buprestidae
Beetles described in 1829